The Achanakmar Wildlife Sanctuary is a sanctuary in Mungeli district of Chhattisgarh and in the Anuppur and Dindori districts of Madhya Pradesh in India. It had been established in 1975, under the provisions of the Indian Wildlife Protection Act of 1972, and declared as a Tiger Reserve under Project Tiger, in 2009. It is a part of the Achanakmar-Amarkantak Biosphere Reserve.

Geography and history 
Linked by the hilly Kanha-Achanakmar Corridor to the tiger reserve in Kanha, Madhya Pradesh, the sanctuary comprises  of forest. The nearest railway station is at Belgahna and nearest airport Bilaspur Airport(Bilasa Bai Kevat) at chakarbhata (10 km from Bilaspur) which have regular flights from Delhi, Jabalpur and Prayagraj. Achanakmar can be reached from Pendra Road and Bilaspur railway stations. Achanakmar has a restaurant, a coffee house and many other facilities. The sanctuary is close to Amarkantak, the source of the Son River and Narmada River.

Flora 
Forest vegetation mainly comprises Sal, Saja, Bija, and Bamboo.

Fauna 

The sanctuary is home to the Bengal tiger, Indian leopard, gaur, chital, striped hyena, Indian jackal, sloth bear, Ussuri dhole, sambar, nilgai, four-horned antelope, chinkara, blackbuck, Indian muntjac and wild boar, four variety of monkeys among other species.

See also 
 Indian Council of Forestry Research and Education
 Tourism in Chhattisgarh

References

External links 

 Achanakmar Wildlife Sanctuary at IndiaTravel.com
 Achanakmar Wildlife Sanctuary at india9.com
 
  Achanakmar Tiger Reserve

Eastern Highlands moist deciduous forests
Tiger reserves of India
Wildlife sanctuaries in Chhattisgarh
1975 establishments in Madhya Pradesh
Protected areas established in 1975
Wildlife sanctuaries in Madhya Pradesh
Dindori district
Mungeli district
Anuppur district